"Burgers and Fries" is a song written by Ben Peters and recorded by American country music artist Charley Pride.  It was released in October 1978 as the second single from his album Burgers and Fries/When I Stop Leaving (I'll Be Gone).  The song peaked at number 2 on the Billboard Hot Country Singles chart. It also reached number 1 on the RPM Country Tracks chart in Canada.

Content
The song is a young man's reflection of a relationship that had failed. He recalls how simple things used to be between the two, recalling the simplicity of such things as "burgers and fries and cherry pies," hand-holding walks along the beach and drive-in movies on moonlit nights, all before things changed between the two and he doesn't know why. He then notes he wishes things could go back to the way they were before. The song was later featured in the 1997 thriller film Breakdown, starring Kurt Russell.

Chart performance

References

1978 singles
1978 songs
Charley Pride songs
Songs written by Ben Peters
RCA Records singles